Sankar Sen ( – 8 February 2020) was an Indian academic, electrical engineer and politician from West Bengal belonging to Communist Party of India (Marxist). He was the vice chancellor of Jadavpur University. He served as a legislator of the West Bengal Legislative Assembly. He also served as the Minister of Power of the Government of West Bengal from 1991 to 1999.

Biography
Sen was the vice chancellor of Jadavpur University. He was a professor of electrical engineering department of Bengal Engineering College too.

Sen was elected as a legislator of the West Bengal Legislative Assembly from Dum Dum in 1991. He was also elected from Dum Dum in 1996. Besides, he served as the Minister of Power of the Government of West Bengal from 1991 to 1999.

Sen died on 8 February 2020 at the age of 92.

References

1920s births
2020 deaths
Academic staff of Jadavpur University
Communist Party of India (Marxist) politicians from West Bengal
Members of the West Bengal Legislative Assembly
State cabinet ministers of West Bengal
Indian electrical engineers
People from North 24 Parganas district
Engineers from West Bengal